Sir John Pollard (died August 1557) was a Speaker of the House of Commons. He became Speaker in 1553 and was made a Knight Bachelor only a few weeks before his death.

Life
  
He was second son of Walter Pollard of Plymouth, by Avice, daughter of Richard Pollard of Way, in the parish of St Giles in the Wood, near Great Torrington, Devon. John Pollard may have been the Pollard who, without Christian name, is mentioned as entering the Middle Temple on 3 June 1515; but it may also be that this entry is that of his relative Lewis Pollard, son of Sir Hugh Pollard and grandson of Sir Lewis Pollard (c. 1465 – 1526), Justice of the Common Pleas. John was appointed Autumn Reader of the Middle Temple in 1535, and became serjeant-at-law in 1547.

In 1529 and 1536 he was elected Member of Parliament for Plymouth.

After 1545 he received, perhaps through the influence of a relative, Richard Pollard, who had taken part in the suppression of the monasteries, a grant of the manor of Nuneham Courtney, where he subsequently lived. He was relieved by patent of 21 October 1550 from his office of serjeant-at-law, in order to become vice-president of the council for the Welsh marches. He was elected member for Oxfordshire in the parliaments of 1553 and 1554, and for Chippenham, Wiltshire in that of 1555.

He was chosen Speaker of the House of Commons in 1553, and again in 1555, holding the office till the close of the parliament of 1555. He was knighted in October 1555.

He had married Mary, daughter of Richard Gray of London, but left no issue. His estates passed mostly to his brother Anthony, after the death of his widow.

Death 
John Pollard died in August 1557, and was buried on 25 August.

References

History of Parliament POLLARD, John (by 1508-1557) of Plymouth, Devon and Nuneham Courteney, Oxon

External links
article

1557 deaths
Year of birth missing
John
16th-century English lawyers
Knights Bachelor
Members of the Parliament of England for Plymouth
Speakers of the House of Commons of England
English MPs 1529–1536
English MPs 1553 (Mary I)
English MPs 1554
English MPs 1554–1555
English MPs 1555
Serjeants-at-law (England)